Lieutenant General Edward Kenneth Smart,  (23 May 1891 – 2 May 1961) was a career officer in the Australian Army, and subsequently a diplomat.

Early years
Ken Smart was born 23 May 1891 in Kew, an inner suburb of Melbourne, Australia, and was educated at Melbourne Church of England Grammar School. He was commissioned into the Corps of Australian Engineers as a second lieutenant on 18 July 1910. On 1 December he was promoted to lieutenant in the Royal Australian Garrison Artillery, and by 1914 was an officer of the Siege Artillery Brigade commanded by Lieutenant Colonel Walter Adams Coxen. On 12 June 1915 he married Phyllis E. Robertson.

Military career

First World War
Smart enlisted in the Australian Imperial Force (AIF) on 21 May 1915, and on 17 July the Siege Artillery Brigade embarked upon HMAT Orsova (A67) from Melbourne, arriving England 25 August.

Smart arrived in France on 2 March 1916, and saw action at Vimy Ridge in May before becoming involved in the Battle of the Somme from June 1916 to March 1917. In September 1916, during the course of heavy fighting in which he was wounded, his actions led to him being awarded the Military Cross. The citation reads:

On 13 December 1916 he was appointed adjutant of the 36th Heavy Artillery Group (HAG) and promoted to the rank of captain. During 1917 he was placed in command of 39th Battery, 10th Australian Field Artillery Brigade, 4th Australian Division, and saw action in Messines (May–June), near Nieuport (July) and near Dixmude (October). In November 1917 he took a position at headquarters 4th Divisional Artillery as a Brigade-Major Trainee, and in December he was mentioned in despatches.

In April 1918 Smart took a position at headquarters Australian Corps near Albert, and in June was promoted to brevet major, taking command of the 110th Howitzer Battery, 10th Australian Field Artillery Brigade. Involved in heavy fighting in August and September, he was seriously wounded on 27 September, and subsequently recommended for the Distinguished Service Order.

His service in the First World War resulted in nine entries in the Australian War Memorial's Honours and Awards database:

Inter-bellum
After discharge from the AIF, Smart remained in the army and from 31 May to 1 October 1919 attended Artillery College in England. He returned to Australia and, from 16 February to 10 September 1920, served as Officer Commanding No. 6 Company, Royal Australian Garrison Artillery, 3rd Military District in Victoria.

Smart then returned to England until February 1925 where he served in a number of positions:

On return to Australia, Smart served in a number of positions until January 1936:

On 16 January 1936, Smart took up the position of Military Liaison Officer in the High Commissioner's Office in London, serving there until 25 August 1939, being promoted to brevet colonel in July 1937.

Second World War
On return to Australia, and the outbreak of the Second World War, on 13 October 1939 Smart was promoted to major general and appointed QuarterMaster General and 3rd Military Member of the Military Board at Army Headquarters in Melbourne. On 24 October 1940 he was promoted to temporary lieutenant general and appointed General Officer Commanding, Southern Command, and District Officer Commanding the 3rd Military District.

In April 1942 he was made substantive lieutenant general and was appointed Australian Military Representative in Washington D.C., or Head of the Australian Military Mission to the United States. In August 1942 he was appointed Australian Army Representative in London; as well as being Head of the Australian Military Mission to the UK, he was Australia's representative on the Imperial War Council. He remained in this position until his retirement from the Australian Army on 2 July 1946.

Post-military career and personal life
From London Smart proceeded to San Francisco where he served as Australian Consul-General from 1946 to 1949, and then to New York, where he continued to serve as Australian Consul-General, from 1946 until his retirement in 1954.

Smart married Phyllis E. Robertson, daughter of Lieutenant Colonel J. Robertson, on 12 June 1915. They had two children; a son and a daughter. Smart's recreations were walking and motoring, and his club was the Navy, Army and Air Force Club in Melbourne. Smart died on 2 May 1961.

Honours
Honours awarded to Ken Smart until 1920:
 Distinguished Service Order
 Military Cross
 1914–15 Star
 British War Medal
 Victory Medal

Also, Mentioned in Despatches: 28 December 1917 and 11 July 1919

References

Further reading
 Warren Perry (1991) Lieutenant-General Edward Kenneth Smart, DSO, MC, MiD: Centenary of his birth in Melbourne: a biographical sketch, OCLC: 222247879

1891 births
1961 deaths
Australian Companions of the Distinguished Service Order
Australian generals
Australian military personnel of World War I
Australian Army personnel of World War II
Australian recipients of the Military Cross
Consuls-General of Australia in New York
Consuls-General of Australia in San Francisco
Military personnel from Melbourne
People from Kew, Victoria
People educated at Melbourne Grammar School